Thomas Martin Wright (born 16 October 1934) was an English cricketer. He was a right-handed batsman and a right-arm fast bowler who played for Norfolk. He was born in Wombwell, Yorkshire.

Wright made a single List A appearance, in the Gillette Cup competition of 1965. From the tailend, he scored 1 not out, though this was not enough to save the team from a heavy defeat against Hampshire.

Wright continued to represent Norfolk in the Minor Counties Championship until the end of the 1965 season.

External links
Martin Wright at CricketArchive 

1934 births
Living people
English cricketers
Norfolk cricketers
People from Wombwell
Cricketers from Yorkshire